El Río may refer to:

Places
El Rio, California, U.S.
El Rio Villa, California, U.S.
El Río (es), barrio of Las Piedras, Puerto Rico
El Río (es), in San Cristóbal de La Laguna, Tenerife, Spain
El Río (es), in San Millán de la Cogolla, La Rioja, Spain

Books
"El río" (es) 1964 story by Julio Cortázar

Music
El Rio (album), by Frankie Ballard 2016

"El Río" (song), 1968 single which was first hit for Miguel Ríos
"El Rio", song by Café Tacuba from Yo Soy

Other
 El Rio, gay bar in San Francisco, California

See also 
 Rio (disambiguation)
 Los Ríos (disambiguation)